David Taylor "Dick" Stewart (24 January 1871 – 1 August 1931) was a New Zealand rugby union player. A loose forward, Stewart represented  at a provincial level, making 15 appearances for the team between 1890 and 1896. He played just one match for the New Zealand national side, against New South Wales at Lancaster Park in Christchurch.

Born at Pigeon Bay on Banks Peninsula on 24 January 1871, Stewart moved with his family to Orari in South Canterbury when he was six months old. He was educated at Winchester and Orari Schools, and was active in the Presbyterian church in the district throughout his life. He married Edith Grace Bates in 1898, and the couple had two sons, including Doug Stewart, who played 28 matches for South Canterbury between 1921 and 1927 and was a New Zealand triallist in 1927. Dick Stewart died at his farm, "Birchbank", at Orari on 1 August 1931, and was buried at Temuka Cemetery.

References

1871 births
1931 deaths
People from Banks Peninsula
New Zealand rugby union players
New Zealand international rugby union players
South Canterbury rugby union players
Rugby union flankers
Burials at Temuka Cemetery